A scaffold, or scaffolding, in construction, is a temporary structure that supports workers and equipment above the ground or floor.

Scaffold and scaffolding may also refer to:

Structures
 Scaffold (execution site), a raised, stage-like site for public executions
 Scaffold (barn), a raised structure on which crops are stored

Science and technology
 Scaffold protein, a regulator of some signalling pathways
 Scaffold, a protein that is used as a starting point for the design of antibody mimetics
 Tissue scaffold, in tissue engineering, an artificial structure capable of supporting three-dimensional tissue formation
 Nano-scaffold, a medical process
 Scaffolding (bioinformatics), a technique in bioinformatics
 Scaffold (programming), two techniques in software architecture

Arts and entertainment
 The Scaffold, an English music and comedy group
 "The Scaffold", song by Elton John from Empty Sky
 Scaffolding (film), a 2017 film

Other uses
 Instructional scaffolding, an education concept and practice